Birla High School in Kolkata, West Bengal, India, was founded by Lakshmi Niwas Birla in 1941. The name of the school was changed from Hindi High School to Birla High School in 1997. The school is an initiative of Vidya Mandir Society.The school is affiliated to the Central Board of Secondary Education

References

External links

Boys' schools in India
High schools and secondary schools in Kolkata
Educational institutions established in 1941
1941 establishments in India